The 1905 Morris Park 5 was the first race in the debut national motor car championship held by the American Automobile Association. It was contested at the Morris Park Racecourse, in the Bronx, New York around a  dirt oval. The race was won by Louis Chevrolet in a 90-horsepower Fiat.

Format
The championship race featured three-and-a-half laps of the dirt oval track at Morris Park Racecourse, to total . Entries were open to drivers of any nationality, and the race was not handicapped. Prize money was awarded to the first two drivers; the winner collected $150, while the runner-up gained $60. Points for the national motor car championship would also be awarded; four points to the winner, two points to second place, and a single point to the driver in third.

Background
It was expected that the championship race would attract a field of famous racing drivers; The Philadelphia Inquirer listed Barney Oldfield, Charles Basle, Henry Ford, Webb Jay and George C. Cannon as probable entrants just over a week before the race, though none of the five eventually took part in the event.

Race

There were just four entries in the five-mile race, which was an open to all categories without any handicapping. Major C. J. S. Miller, in his Renault, was unable to start the race due to a gasoline feed failure. The remaining three cars started on the back straight. Louis Chevrolet led the race from start to finish in the 90-horsepower Fiat, which was significantly more powerfully that his rivals; Guy Vaughn was racing in a 40-horsepower Decauville, while Dan Wurgis had a 32-horsepower Reo Bird. Chevrolet completed the race in 4 minutes and 48 seconds. Vaughn was second for most of the race, holding a lead of around  ahead of Wurgis, but as they started the final lap, he dropped away and coasted to a stop on the back straight with a broken gasoline feed pipe. Wurgis finished in second in 5 minutes and 30 seconds.

Race result

Other events
The five-mile race was part of a day of races and time trials at the Morris Park Racecourse. The day began with Chevrolet attempting to break the world record for the fastest mile with a flying start. Using the same car as the previous record had been set in, owned by Major C. J. S. Miller. He completed one lap to get up to speed, and then began his timed attempt on the back straight. Despite having to shut the power off completely around the corners, Chevrolet improved on his previous time, setting a new record of 52.2 seconds, shaving three-fifths of a second off the old record.

References

1905 in motorsport
1905 in American motorsport
June 1905 sports events
AAA Championship Car
Motorsport in New York (state)
1905 in sports in New York City
Morris Park Racecourse
Sports in the Bronx